The 1892 Missouri Tigers football team was an American football team that represented the University of Missouri as a member of the Western Interstate University Football Association (WIUFA) during the 1891 college football season. In its first season under head coach E. H. Jones, the team compiled a 1–2 record.

Schedule

References

Missouri
Missouri Tigers football seasons
Missouri Tigers football